David Riley (born August 2, 1967) is a former American football quarterback who played two seasons in the Arena Football League (AFL) with the Cincinnati Rockers and Milwaukee Mustangs.

Riley was a three-sport standout (basketball, football, baseball) at Valley View High School in Germantown, Ohio. He set school records (since surpassed) for single season and career touchdown passes and passing yards. His single game record of 409 passing yards still stands.

Riley played collegiately at Ball State University. As a senior, he was selected as the MAC Offensive Player of the Year, as well as the recipient of the Vern Smith Leadership Award, given to the conference's Most Valuable Player.

References

External links
Just Sports Stats
College Stats

Living people
1967 births
Players of American football from Ohio
American football quarterbacks
Ball State Cardinals football players
Cincinnati Rockers players
Milwaukee Mustangs (1994–2001) players
People from Germantown, Ohio